The United States Court of Appeals for the Sixth Circuit (in case citations, 6th Cir.) is a federal court with appellate jurisdiction over the district courts in the following districts:

 Eastern District of Kentucky
 Western District of Kentucky
 Eastern District of Michigan
 Western District of Michigan
 Northern District of Ohio
 Southern District of Ohio
 Eastern District of Tennessee
 Middle District of Tennessee
 Western District of Tennessee

The court is composed of sixteen judges and is based at the Potter Stewart U.S. Courthouse in Cincinnati, Ohio. It is one of 13 United States courts of appeals.

William Howard Taft, the only person ever to serve as both President and Chief Justice of the United States, once served on the Sixth Circuit. Four other judges of the Sixth Circuit have been elevated to serve on the Supreme Court.


Current composition of the Court 
:

Vacancies and pending nominations

List of former judges

Chief judges

Succession of seats

See also 
 Judicial appointment history for United States federal courts#Sixth Circuit
 List of current United States Circuit Judges

Notes

References 
 
 primary but incomplete source for the duty stations
 
 secondary source for the duty stations
 data is current to 2002
 
 source for the state, lifetime, term of active judgeship, term of chief judgeship, term of senior judgeship, appointer, termination reason, and seat information
 
 obituary for death of Susan Bieke Neilson

External links 

 United States Court of Appeals for the Sixth Circuit
 Recent opinions from FindLaw

 
Ann Arbor, Michigan
Cincinnati
Cleveland
Columbus, Ohio
Detroit
Memphis, Tennessee
Nashville, Tennessee
1891 establishments in the United States
Courts and tribunals established in 1891